The Atlas Underground is the fourth studio album by American rock musician Tom Morello and the first one released uniquely under his own name. The album was released on October 12, 2018, by Mom + Pop Music. The album features guest appearances from Knife Party, Bassnectar, Big Boi, Killer Mike, Portugal. The Man, Whethan, Vic Mensa, Marcus Mumford, Steve Aoki, Tim McIlrath, K.Flay, Pretty Lights, Carl Restivo, Gary Clark Jr., Nico Stadi, Leikeli47, GZA, RZA and Herobust.

Critical reception

The Atlas Underground received generally positive reviews from critics. At Metacritic, which assigns a normalized rating out of 100 to reviews from mainstream publications, the album received an average score of 63, based on 9 reviews.

Track listing

Charts

References

2018 albums
Tom Morello albums
Mom + Pop Music albums